Moca discophora is a moth in the family Immidae. It was described by John Hartley Durrant in 1915. It is found on New Guinea.

References

Moths described in 1915
Immidae
Moths of New Guinea